Pomasia obliterata is a moth in the family Geometridae. It is found on Borneo, Peninsular Malaysia and Siberut Island. The habitat consists of lowland areas, including alluvial forests.

The ground colour is bone-white with grey markings.

References

Moths described in 1866
Eupitheciini